L113 may refer to:
 Scania L113, a bus model
 Lectionary 113, a Greek manuscript of the New Testament
 Children's Corner, a suite for solo piano by Claude Debussy completed in 1908